Drabgam is a village in the Jammu and Kashmir Union Territory of India. It is one of the largest villages in the Pulwama district by population and area.

Demography 
The total land area of Drabgam is around 728 hectares (1798.92 acres) which consists of a total household of around 860. The total population is around 5387 according to the 2011 census.  In this, the Male population is around 2795, and the female population comprises 2592. The pin code for the village is 192306.

Education 
 Daffodil international University 
 Ahsanullah Technology 
 Chaumuhani Government Primary School

 Sir Syed Memorial Private School

Economy 
Horticulture makes up 90% of the economic production.

References 

Villages in Pulwama district